Hormuz  is derived from the Persian Ohrmuzd, meaning Ahura Mazda.  It may refer to:

 The Strait of Hormuz in the Persian Gulf
Hormuz District, an administrative subdivision of Iran
 Hormuz Island, an Iranian island in the Persian Gulf
 Hormuz, Iran, a city on the island and in the district
 Hormuz, Fars, a village in Fars Province, Iran
 Hormuz, Kerman, a village in Kerman Province, Iran
 Hormuz, alternate name of the village Hormud-e Mehr Khui, Fars Province, Iran
 The Kingdom of Ormus (11th Century–1622)
 Hormuz Formation, a geologic salt feature in Iran

See also
 Hurmuz (disambiguation)
 Hormizd (disambiguation)